Geoffrey Leonard Simmons (born 27 December 1974) is an economist and former leader of The Opportunities Party (TOP), a political party in New Zealand. He stood for TOP in the February 2017 Mount Albert by-election, in the Wellington Central electorate in the 2017 general election, and in the Rongotai electorate in the 2020 general election.

Early life
Simmons grew up in Ōkaihau (Far North) and West Auckland, the son of two teachers. He graduated in economics from the University of Auckland. He worked as an economic analyst for the New Zealand Treasury from 1999 to 2003. He worked as an economic advisor for the UK Home Office in 2003–05 and then for the East Midlands Development Agency in 2005–08. He was the general manager and an economist for the Morgan Foundation (founded by Gareth Morgan) in Wellington from 2009 to 2016. He has co-authored four books with Morgan, on health (Health Cheque: The Truth We Should All Know about New Zealand's Public Health System), fishing (Hook, Line and Blinkers: Everything Kiwis Never Wanted to Know about Fishing), Antarctica (Ice, Mice and Men: the Issues Facing our Far South) and food (Appetite for Destruction: Food – the Good, the Bad and the Fatal). He is a Lancet Commission on Obesity Fellow.

Simmons has done acting, including improvisational theatre, since he was at secondary school. He has performed with the Improv Bandits, a professional troupe in Auckland, Best on Tap in Wellington, and Stagecraft at the Gryphon Theatre in Wellington. He teaches with the Wellington Improv Troupe.

Political career

2017 general election

In the February 2017 Mount Albert by-election, Simmons stood as a candidate for the Opportunities Party (TOP), founded by Gareth Morgan. He came third, with 623 votes, 4.56% of 13,649 valid votes.

On 24 May 2017, Gareth Morgan announced that Simmons as the deputy leader of TOP and their candidate in the Wellington Central electorate in the 2017 New Zealand general election. During the 2017 election for Wellington Central held on 23 September, Simmons came fourth place with 2,892 votes.

TOP revamp and leadership

In December 2017, three months after the election, Morgan resigned as leader and Simmons and two candidates also stepped down from their roles. In August 2018, TOP appointed Simmons as interim leader until an election of party members could be held to determine a replacement to Morgan. In the ensuing internal leadership election, Simmons contested the position with four other candidates. On 8 December 2018, the party board announced Simmons had been successful.

During the TOP's party relaunch held in October 2019, Simmons delivered a speech advocating a universal basic income and "breaking the Labour / National duopoly".

2020 election

In July 2020, Simmons announced that he would contest the Rongotai electorate during the 2020 New Zealand general election. At the beginning of his campaign for the seat Simmons spelled the name of the electorate incorrectly in his advertising as "Rongatai".

During the 2020 election held on 17 October, Simmons came fourth place in Rongotai with 2,794 votes. Based on full results published on 6 November, the TOP party won 43,449 party votes (1.5% of the popular vote). Following the election results, Simmons and deputy leader Shai Navot emailed members, supporters, and donors, thanking them for their support.

During the party's first annual general meeting held on 3 November, Simmons resigned as leader of TOP.

Electoral history

2017 Mount Albert by-election

2017 Wellington Central general election

2020 Rongotai general election

Leadership elections

2018 Opportunities Party leadership election

References

1974 births
Living people
People from Auckland
21st-century New Zealand politicians
University of Auckland alumni
The Opportunities Party politicians
Unsuccessful candidates in the 2017 New Zealand general election
Unsuccessful candidates in the 2020 New Zealand general election
New Zealand economists
The Opportunities Party leaders